Cassa di Risparmio di Piacenza e Vigevano was an Italian savings bank based in Piacenza, Emilia-Romagna, as well as a second office in Vigevano, Lombardy. Despite the bank ceased to be exist, the former owner of the bank still operated as a charity organization.

History
Cassa di Risparmio di Piacenza e Vigevano was a merger of the saving banks of Piacenza and Vigevano, found in 1860 (as part of Monte di Pietà di Piacenza) and 1857 respectively. Due to Legge Amato, Cassa di Risparmio di Piacenza e Vigevano became two entity, società per azioni and the foundation in December 1991, with the latter acted as a charity organization. The foundation sold a minority interests to the holding company Casse Emiliano Romagnole (CAER), which the foundation in turn became a minority owner of CAER. The bank also recapitalized 24,022,900,000 lire in January 1992. However, the bank withdrew in order to favour another merger with Cassa di Risparmio di Parma in December 1992.

References

Banks established in 1860
Banks disestablished in 1992
1860 establishments in Italy
1992 disestablishments in Italy
Defunct banks of Italy
Companies based in Piacenza
Banca Intesa
Mounts of piety